The Downtown Candlemas Church of the Blessed Virgin Mary, formerly known as the Mosque of Pasha Qasim is a Roman Catholic church in Pécs, Hungary, which was a mosque in the 16–17th century due to the Ottoman conquest. It is one of the symbols of the city, located in the downtown, on the main square (Széchenyi square). The current building, a hundred steps in length and in width, was built by Pasha Qasim the Victorious between 1543 and 1546. The mosque was converted into a church in 1702, after Habsburg-Hungarian troops reconquered the city. The minaret was destroyed by the Jesuits in 1766. One of the largest Ottoman constructions remaining in Hungary, the building still retains many Turkish architectural characteristics.

History 

Standing at the highest point of Pécs's Széchenyi square, the mosque of pasha Qasim is the greatest example of Turkish architecture in Hungary. It probably was built in the second half of the 16th century, some years after the Ottomans occupied Pécs in 1543. In the 1660s, the famous Turkish traveller Evliya Çelebi wrote of the overwhelming majesty of its view.

A number of changes were made to the building between the 18th and the 20th centuries: its minaret was taken down after having been enlarged; only the bulk (the octagon drum, covered by a dome, patterned after traditional Orthodox cathedrals) remained of the original structure. Arc windows are set in two rows on the façades of the southeastern, southwestern, and northeastern sides of the building; 3–3 and 4-4 pieces. Inside, some Ottoman decoration and inscriptions from the Qur'an are clearly visible in the remaining plaster parts. The Turkish pulpit and the women's balcony have been destroyed, and the mihrab is not the original. The two Turkish bathing basins before the sacristies (today, holy water) were taken from the former bath of the pasha next to the church.  The building now functions as a Roman Catholic church.

References
 Rados Jenő: Magyar építészettörténet (p. 161–168) – 1961. Bp. Műszaki K. – ETO 72 (439) 091 
 Szerk. Fülep L.: A magyarországi művészet története (p. 371–372) – Bp.1961. Képzőmúv. Alap K. – Kossuth Ny. 61.3465. 
 Goldziher Ignác: Az iszlám kultúrája – Gondolat K. Bp. 1981. –  
 H. Stierlin: Iszlám művészet és építészet – Bp. Alexandra K. –  
 H. Stierlin. Türkei – Architektur von Seldschuken bis Osmanen – Taschen Weltarchitektur –   (German)

External links 
 Terebess Asia-lexicon
 Aerial photos of the mosque and the city.

Buildings and structures in Pécs
Tourist attractions in Pécs
Roman Catholic churches in Hungary
Former mosques in Hungary
Ottoman mosques in Hungary
Churches converted from mosques
Conversion of non-Christian religious buildings and structures into churches
Buildings converted to Catholic church buildings